Lesbian Visibility Week (related to Lesbian Visibility Day)  is an annual observance in the United States, the United Kingdom and other countries dedicated to increasing the awareness of lesbian women and their issues. It was originally celebrated in July in 1990 in California, and more recently in April, starting with Lesbian Visibility Day on April 26. It has been celebrated in England and Wales.

Historical observations 
In mid-July from 1990 to 1992 in West Hollywood, Lesbian Visibility Week was celebrated annually. It was conceived out of lesbians' frustrations with the higher visibility of LGBT men than LBGT women, and intended to gain awareness and sociopolitical capital.

The week was coordinated by West Hollywood Lesbian Visibility Committee and the Los Angeles Gay and Lesbian Center and devoted to raising awareness of lesbian identities and topics and celebrating the lesbian community. The celebration was "a combination of cultural programming, workshops addressing current and impending needs, awards ceremonies, and social events." The events included film screenings, safe sex discussions, dog shows, marches, and more.

Recent observations

2020 
In 2020, Linda Riley, publisher of Diva magazine, began a new Lesbian Visibility Week. The inaugural week took place from the 20th of April 2020, ending on Lesbian Visibility Day, 26 April.  LGBT speakers included president of GLAAD Sarah Kate Ellis Henderson, BBC Newsreader Jane Hill, and UK Black Pride founder Phyll Opoku Gyimah. Some brands and companies hosted their own events.

2021 
Lesbian Visibility Week 2021 took place between 26 April and 2 May 2021, and was powered by DIVA magazine, Stonewall (a charity) and Facebook. During this week, the Mayor of London Sadiq Khan flew the lesbian flag at City Hall, London to launch the week.

Related observations 
International Lesbian Day is a related observation that is observed on October 8 annually. It started in New Zealand in the 1980's and is celebrated mainly in New Zealand and Australia.

National Day of Lesbian Visibility is an established date in Brazil created by Brazilian lesbian activists and dedicated to the date on which the 1st National Lesbian Seminar - Senale took place, on August 29, 1996. It happens every  since 2003.

In popular culture 
Several celebrities have come out in Lesbian Visibility Day including Megan Rapinoe, Da Brat, and Lena Waithe.

References 

Lesbians
LGBT awareness periods
Awareness weeks in the United States